Joke Dierdorp (born 21 January 1955) is a retired Dutch rower. She was most successful in the coxless pair, finishing with Karin Abma in second, third and fourth place at the world championships of 1977, 1978 and 1979, respectively; in 1979 they missed a bronze medal by about 0.6 seconds. In the coxed eights, she was fourth at the 1975 World Championships and eighth at the 1976 Summer Olympics.

References

1955 births
Living people
Dutch female rowers
Olympic rowers of the Netherlands
Rowers at the 1976 Summer Olympics
People from Willemstad
World Rowing Championships medalists for the Netherlands
20th-century Dutch women
21st-century Dutch women